Dame Louise Mary Richardson  (born 8 June 1958) is an Irish political scientist whose specialist field is the study of terrorism. In January 2023, she became president of the philanthropic foundation, Carnegie Corporation of New York, In January 2016, she became the Vice-Chancellor of the University of Oxford, having formerly served as the Principal and Vice-Chancellor of the University of St Andrews, and as the executive dean of the Radcliffe Institute for Advanced Study at Harvard University. Her leadership at the University of Oxford played an important role in the successful development of a vaccine to combat Covid-19.

Early life and education
Richardson grew up in Tramore, County Waterford, one of seven children of Arthur and Julie Richardson. After attending primary school at The Star of the Sea convent girls' school in Tramore, and St Angela's Secondary School, Ursuline Convent, Waterford, she studied at Trinity College, Dublin, where she obtained a Bachelor of Arts degree in history, promoted in the usual way to a Master of Arts degree in 1982.

In 1977, she received a Rotary Scholarship to study at the University of California, Los Angeles (UCLA). She took an MA degree in political science from UCLA in 1981, followed by a move to Harvard, where she received a Master of Arts degree in government in 1984 and a PhD in 1989 on government, relating specifically to the Falklands War and Suez Crisis.

Career
From 1989 to 2001 Richardson served as an assistant professor and then an associate professor in the John F. Kennedy School of Government at Harvard. During this period she also served for eight years as Head Tutor and chair of the Board of Tutors (Director of Undergraduate Studies) in the School of Government Department. Richardson continued to serve in numerous administrative capacities at Harvard, including the Faculty Council and various committees concerned with undergraduate education, the status of women, and human rights. In July 2001, she was appointed executive dean of the Radcliffe Institute for Advanced Study.

Richardson's academic focus has been on international security with an emphasis on terrorist movements. She taught Harvard's large undergraduate lecture course, Terrorist Movements in International Relations, for which she won the 
Levenson Prize, awarded by the undergraduate student body to the best teachers at the university. This class, along with a number of graduate courses on terrorist movements and European terrorism, were for many years the only courses offered on the subject at Harvard. In addition to the Levenson Prize, Richardson has received teaching awards from the American Political Science Association and Pi Sigma Alpha for outstanding teaching in political science; the Abramson Award in recognition of her "excellence and sensitivity in teaching undergraduates" and many awards from the Bok Center for Teaching Excellence. After her 2001 Radcliffe appointment, she continued to teach, both at Harvard College and Harvard Law School.

In 2009, Richardson was appointed Principal of the University of St Andrews, succeeding Brian Lang. Her installation took place on 25 March 2009. She is the first woman, as well as the first Roman Catholic in modern times, to occupy the position. She was appointed Professor of International Relations at St Andrews in November 2010.

Unlike previous principals, Richardson was not granted honorary membership to the Royal and Ancient Golf Club, which was all-male. Richardson spoke out about how the membership policies interfered with fundraising and the values of the university.

In 2014, just before the referendum on Scottish independence, it was revealed that Richardson had resisted pressure by then First Minister Alex Salmond to tone down her comments on the impact of Scottish independence on research universities, and resisted pressure from an aide to Salmond to issue a statement praising the SNP government.

On 28 May 2015, the University of Oxford announced that Richardson had been nominated as the next Vice-Chancellor, subject to approval, to take up the post on 1 January 2016. The nomination was approved on 25 June 2015, and Richardson became the university's first female Vice-Chancellor in January 2016. She is also an Honorary Fellow at Kellogg College, Oxford.

In October 2017, Richardson claimed that Oxford University was in need of reform, stating that the current system gives rise to "a waste of resources" and a "duplication of bureaucracy". At her annual Oration, she stated, "We all know that change occurs slowly at Oxford…but the world is changing rapidly around us, and I believe that if we stand still we will enter a period of slow but definite decline."

In late February 2018, the University of Oxford's support for cuts to the national lecturers' pension scheme triggered a 14-day strike. A resolution to revert the decision was spearheaded by six Oxford academics, including Karma Nabulsi and Robert Gildea. On Tuesday, 6 March 2018, Richardson used a technicality to upend a debate on the plans. At a meeting of Congregation, the governing body of Oxford, 20 members and supporters of Richardson stood up as the resolution was introduced, thereby blocking the debate. Academics then held an unofficial vote outside, which delivered a result of 442 for and 2 against. Richardson herself stated that she had been absent at the event due to having "scheduled a trip to New York". An initial offer on her part for a non-binding "town hall discussion" as a replacement for the debate was rejected.

The following day, Richardson sent out an email to staff in which she stated that "In the light of the depth of feeling of so many colleagues, we will convene a special meeting of council today at noon" at which it would be recommended that the university's council "reverse its response to the UUK survey in line with the congregation’s resolution".

In an interview with the Daily Telegraph in July 2019 Richardson addressed the issue of higher education funding in the UK, noting that "Our American competitors are so far ahead of us in fundraising". Her approach has been to explore alternative sources of funding, including a fundraising campaign, the Oxford Thinking Campaign, that raised £3.3 billion; a £4 billion partnership with Legal and General to provide staff housing and science facilities; securing a £150 million donation from US billionaire Stephen Schwarzman to fund humanities research at the University of Oxford; securing an £80 million donation from the Reuben Foundation to endow Reuben College (formerly Parks College); and a £750 million bond issuance in December 2017 (increased to £1 billion in 2020) - the biggest amount raised this way by a UK university.

Amidst the 2019-20 Hong Kong protests, Richardson was recognized for her leadership and advocacy. Richardson was "admirably robust when threatened by the Chinese embassy with the withdrawal of Chinese students from Oxford unless she stopped its chancellor Chris Patten visiting Hong Kong", and was noted as having "more balls than any male [Vice-Chancellor]".

As part of efforts to broaden access to the University of Oxford, Richardson committed the university to ensuring that by 2023, 25% of the British students admitted will be from underrepresented backgrounds – compared to 15% as of 2019.

In November 2021, it was announced that Richardson would become the next president of the Carnegie Corporation of New York in January 2023, at the end of her 7-year term as Oxford vice-chancellor.

Finances and criticism
Richardson's salary was criticised as excessive in 2017 (quoted as £410,000). Richardson has separately been criticized for abuse of expenses, including claiming £70,000 in a single year on travel and dining as Vice-Chancellor. Richardson publicly lists her expenses on the university website.

During the COVID-19 pandemic, she received further criticism for retaining her salary while University of Oxford staff were put on furlough.

In September 2017, Richardson attracted criticism from students, academics, politicians, and the British press for remarks made in defence of academic freedom that were interpreted by critics as a defence of academics holding anti-gay views towards students.  Richardson had previously been involved in debates around free speech and around attempts by university students to bar some speakers from campuses.  At the University of St. Andrews, Richardson encouraged academics to share their views on the independence referendum and in her first few months at Oxford University she voiced the view that higher education was not meant to be a comfortable experience and that students ought to engage with views they found objectionable.

Richardson's comments in June 2020 during the Black Lives Matter protests attracted further public criticism. She suggested that Nelson Mandela would not have wanted the controversial statue of Cecil Rhodes removed.

Research
Richardson is the author of What Terrorists Want, an account of terrorism written after the September 11 attacks. Other publications include When Allies Differ: Anglo-American Relations in the Suez and Falkland Crises, The Roots of Terrorism (ed) and Democracy and Counterterrorism: Lessons from the Past (co-edited with Robert Art). She has also published many journal articles, book chapters, and reviews on the subject of terrorism.

Between 2001 and 2008, in addition to her teaching and management roles, Richardson gave over 300 talks and lectures on terrorism and counter-terrorism to educational and private groups as well as policy makers, the military, intelligence, and business communities. She has testified before the United States Senate and has appeared on CNN, the BBC, PBS, NPR, Fox and a host of other broadcast outlets. Her work has been featured in numerous international periodicals.

Published works

 What Terrorists Want: Understanding the Enemy, Containing the Threat (2006)
 The Roots of Terrorism, Routledge, New York (2006) ed
 When Allies Differ: Anglo-American Relations in the Suez and Falkland Crises (1996)
 Democracy and Counterterrorism: Lessons from the Past, United States Institute of Peace, Washington DC (2007) ed with Robert Art

Awards and honours
In 2009 Richardson received the Trinity College Dublin Alumni Award. In 2010 she was elected a Fellow of the Royal Society of Edinburgh (FRSE), and in 2011 she was appointed to the Scottish Government's Council of Economic Advisers. In 2012, ahead of the centenary in 2014 of the outbreak of World War One, she was appointed to the Scottish Commemorations Panel. In 2013 Harvard University awarded Richardson The Graduate School of Arts and Sciences Centennial Medal, and later in the year she received an honorary doctorate from the Moscow State Institute of International Relations (MGIMO).

In 2015  Richardson received honorary doctorates from the University of Aberdeen and Queen's University Belfast. and was named an honorary member of the Royal Irish Academy. In 2016 Richardson was elected to the American Academy of Arts and Sciences, named a fellow of the National Academy of Social Sciences, and awarded honorary doctorates by Trinity College Dublin and the University of St Andrews; she also received the inaugural Emily Winifred Dickson award from the Royal College of Surgeons in Ireland, which recognises women who have made an outstanding contribution to their field. In 2016 she was also elected to Honorary Fellowship of Trinity College Dublin. Additionally, Richardson serves as an elected member of the American Philosophical Society. In 2018, she received an honorary degree from the University of Notre Dame and spoke as the primary speaker at the Notre Dame Graduate School Commencement Ceremony. In her final year as Vice Chancellor of Oxford, she was elected to Honorary Fellowship of St Hugh's College, Oxford.

In October 2019, Richardson joined the board of trustees at The Sutton Trust. She serves on the boards of a number of other non-profit groups including the Central European University, the Carnegie Corporation and the EastWest Institute (to October 2015). She has served on the editorial boards of a number of journals and presses and been awarded numerous prizes including the Sumner Prize for work towards the prevention of war and the establishment of universal peace. She has lectured on the subject of terrorism and counter-terrorism to public, professional, media and education groups across the world.

Richardson was appointed Dame Commander of the Order of the British Empire (DBE) in the 2022 Birthday Honours for services to higher education.

References

1958 births
Living people
Alumni of Trinity College Dublin
University of California, Los Angeles alumni
Harvard University alumni
Harvard University faculty
Academics of the University of St Andrews
Honorary Fellows of Trinity College Dublin
International relations scholars
Irish political scientists
Principals of the University of St Andrews
People from County Waterford
Fellows of the Royal Society of Edinburgh
Terrorism theorists
Vice-Chancellors of the University of Oxford
Members of the American Philosophical Society
Fellows of the Academy of Social Sciences
Women heads of universities and colleges
Women political scientists
Dames Commander of the Order of the British Empire